José I. Blandón may refer to:
 José Isabel Blandón Castillo, former top aide to Manuel Noriega
 José Isabel Blandón Figueroa (born 1967), Panamanian legislator